Igor Yudin (born 21 November 1957) is a Belarusian alpine skier. He competed in the men's super-G at the 1998 Winter Olympics.

References

1957 births
Living people
Belarusian male alpine skiers
Olympic alpine skiers of Belarus
Alpine skiers at the 1998 Winter Olympics
People from Sovetskaya Gavan